Fengjing ( 枫泾) is a town in Jinshan District, Shanghai.

Fengjing may also refer to:

Places
Fengjing (Zhou) (灃京), part of Fenghao, the ancient capital of the Duchy of Zhou
Fengjing, Anhui (冯井), a town in Huoqiu County, Lu'an, Anhui

Other
Fengjing pig